Graeme Montgomery (born 3 March 1988) is an English footballer who plays as a midfielder for St Albans.

He played for National League South side St Albans City on loan from Boreham Wood, following his release from Eastleigh on 24 February 2012. He then joined the Saints rivals, Hemel Hempstead Town FC, after being transferred from Boreham Wood. Graeme then signed the Saints for an undisclosed fee at the beginning of December 2016.

Career
He made his debut for Dagenham & Redbridge in a League Two match, in the 1–1 draw away at Barnet on 17 January 2009, coming on as a substitute in the 89th minute for Jon Nurse.

In the 2009–10 season, Montgomery broke into the Daggers team. He started a league game for them and on 17 April 2010, he scored his first ever Football League goal. This came in the 95th minute, after he came on as a substitute for Josh Scott in the 2–1 home victory against Burton Albion.

On 18 November 2010, he was loaned out to Hayes & Yeading United for one month. After the deal ran out, on 30 December, Montgomery was signed by Newport County on another loan until the end of the season. In May 2011, Dagenham announced the release of Montgomery at the end of his contract.

Montgomery initially joined Conference South side Eastleigh from Aldershot Town on loan on 16 September 2011. The loan was initially for 1 month, but following impressive performances, the loan was extended by an extra month twice, until Montgomery was released by Aldershot and joined Eastleigh on a contract until the end of the 2011/12 season on 16 December 2011. This was short-lived, as due to new arrivals at the club, he lost his place in the starting line up, and was eventually released from Eastleigh on 24 February 2012.

Montgomery signed for Boreham Wood on 5 March 2012.

References

External links 
Graeme Montgomery profile at daggers.co.uk

Living people
1988 births
English footballers
Dagenham & Redbridge F.C. players
Wealdstone F.C. players
Hayes & Yeading United F.C. players
Newport County A.F.C. players
Aldershot Town F.C. players
Eastleigh F.C. players
Boreham Wood F.C. players
St Albans City F.C. players
English Football League players
Isthmian League players
National League (English football) players
Footballers from the London Borough of Enfield
Association football midfielders